Rehearsal is an EP by Canadian metal band A Perfect Murder, released on January 18, 2005. It was produced by Louis Dionne and features six tracks.

Track listing 

A Perfect Murder (band) albums
2005 EPs
Cyclop Media albums